is a Japanese footballer who last played for YSCC Yokohama.

Career statistics

Club
.

Notes

References

External links

2000 births
Living people
Association football people from Chiba Prefecture
Japanese footballers
Japanese expatriate footballers
Association football forwards
J3 League players
Kashiwa Reysol players
Bayer 04 Leverkusen players
YSCC Yokohama players
Japanese expatriate sportspeople in Germany
Expatriate footballers in Germany